CYP3A7 is an enzyme belonging to the cytochrome P450 family. It is 503 amino acids in size and shares 87% of its sequence with CYP3A4. It carries out a similar role in fetuses that CYP3A4 serves in adults. The gene location is 7q22.1.

The CYP3A group of enzymes are the most abundantly expressed members of the cytochrome P450 family in liver. They are responsible for the metabolism of more than 50% of all clinical pharmaceuticals.

Notable alleles
The CYP3A7*1C allele is associated with poor outcomes in some cancer patients, possibly because of the effect of the enzyme on some chemotherapy agents.

References

External links
 
 

3
EC 1.14.14